The Perfect Gift is a 2009 spinoff of the 2005 Christian drama film The Perfect Stranger, and its first sequel, Another Perfect Stranger. It stars Christina Fougnie, Amy Hess, Matt Wallace and Jefferson Moore once again as Jesus Christ. It was filmed almost entirely in Kentucky, where the first two movies in the series were not.

Plot 
Maxine Noelle Westray (Christina Fougnie) is a beautiful and wealthy girl, yet she is incredibly spoiled and bratty. Born on Christmas, she only sees that day as a time for lavish and expensive gifts. Her overworked executive mother (Amy Hess) is struggling to provide "suitable" gifts for her young children. A disillusioned young minister (Matt Wallace) does not see Christmas as a minister should. Then one day a drifter (Jefferson Moore) comes into town and changes these three people's lives forever by teaching them the true meaning of Christmas and that the best gift of all doesn't come in wrapping.

External links 

 

Films about evangelicalism
2009 films
Films shot in Kentucky
2009 drama films
American sequel films
American drama films
2000s English-language films
2000s American films